Anthony Edward Walsby, BSc(Birm), PhD(Lond), FRS, is the Emeritus Professor of Microbiology at the School of Biological Sciences, University of Bristol.

He is a researcher in the fields of Algae, Cyanobacteria, lake ecology, gas vesicles/vacuoles and genetics, covering the European lakes and Baltic Sea. He is noted for his discovery of Haloquadratum walsbyi in brine ponds on the Sinai Peninsula in 1980.  He was elected Fellow of the Royal Society, 11 March 1993.

Specifically his research includes:
Gas vesicles of cyanobacteria: physiology; structure; molecular biology; ecology
The natural selection of gas vesicles in relation to depth of lakes and oceans
Population genetics of cyanobacteria using PCR on single filaments from lakes
The cyanobacterium Planktothrix rubescens in stratified lakes
Calculating the daily integrals of growth and photosynthesis in lakes

Selected publications

PubMed
  Walsby, A.E. 1991. The mechanical properties of the Microcystis  gas vesicle. Journal of General Microbiology 137, 2401–2408.
 Walsby, A.E., Revsbech, N.P. & Griffel, D.H. 1992. The gas permeability coefficient of the cyanobacterial gas vesicle wall. Journal of General Microbiology 138, 837–845.
 Buchholz, B.E.E., Hayes, P.K. & Walsby, A.E. 1993. The distribution of the outer gas vesicle protein, GvpC, on the Anabaena gas vesicle, and its ratio to GvpA. Journal of General Microbiology, 139, 2353–2363.
 Walsby, A.E. 1994. Gas vesicles. Microbiological Reviews, 58, 94-144.
 Kinsman, R., Walsby, A.E. & Hayes, P.K. 1995. GvpCs with reduced numbers of repeating sequence elements bind to and strengthen cyanobacterial gas vesicles. Molecular Microbiology, 17, 147–154.
 McMaster, T.J., Miles, M.J. & Walsby, A.E. 1996. Direct observation of protein secondary structure in gas vesicles by atomic force microscopy. Biophysics Journal, 70, 2432–2436.
 Walsby, A.E. & A. Avery. 1996. Measurement of filamentous cyanobacteria by image analysis. Journal of Microbiological Methods 26, 11–20.
 Walsby, A.E. 1997. Numerical integration of phytoplankton through depth and time in a water column. New Phytologist, 136, 189–209.
 Walsby, A.E., Hayes, P.K., Boje, R. & Stal, L.J. 1997. The selective advantage of buoyancy provided by gas vesicles for planktonic cyanobacteria in the Baltic Sea. New Phytologist, 136, 407–417.
 Walsby, A.E., Avery, A. & Schanz, F. 1998. The critical pressures of gas vesicles in Planktothrix rubescens in relation to the depth of winter mixing in Lake Zurich, Switzerland. Journal of Plankton Research 20: 1357–1375.
 Walsby, AE & Holland, DP. (2006) Sinking velocities of phytoplankton measured on a stable density gradient by laser scanning. Journal of the Royal Society Interface, The Royal Society, 3 (8), 429 - 439.
 Dunton, PG, Mawby, WJ, Shaw, VA & Walsby, AE. (2006) Analysis of tryptic digests indicates regions of GvpC that bind to gas vesicles of Anabaena flos-aquae. Microbiology, Society for General Microbiology, 152 (6), 1661 - 1669.
 Walsby, AE & Dunton, PG. (2006) Gas vesicles in actinomycetes? Trends in Microbiology, Elsevier, 14 (3), 99 - 100.
 Walsby, AE. (2006) Gordon Elliott Fogg CBE, 26 April 1919 - 30 January 2005. Biographical Memoirs of Fellows of the Royal Society, Royal Society, 52, 97 - 116.
 Walsby, AE, Schanz, F & Schmidt, M. (2006) The Burgundy-blood phenomenon: a model of buoyancy change explains autumnal waterblooms of Planktothrix rubescens in Lake Zurich. New Phytologist, Blackwell, 169 (1), 109 - 122.
Walsby, AE & Juttner, F. (2006) The uptake of amino acids by the cyanobacterium Planktothrix rubescens is stimulated by light at low irradiances. FEMS Microbiology Ecology, Blackwell, 58 (1), 14 - 22.
 Walsby, AE. (2005) Archaea with square cells. Trends in Microbiology, 13, 193 - 195.
 Dunton, PG & Walsby, AE. (2005) The diameter and critical collapse pressure of gas vesicles in Microcystis are correlated with GvpCs of different length. FEMS Letters, 247, 37 - 43.
 Walsby, AE. (2005) Stratification by cyanobacteria in lakes: a dynamic buoyancy model indicates size limitations met by Planktothrix rubescens filaments. New Phytologist, Blackwell, 168 (2), 365 - 376.
 Walsby, AE, Ng, G, Dunn, C & Davis, PA. (2004) Comparison of the depth where Planktothrix rubescens stratifies and the depth where the daily insolation supports its neutral buoyancy. New Phytologist, 162, 133 - 145.

References

External links
Professor Anthony Walsby

English biologists
Living people
Fellows of the Royal Society
Year of birth missing (living people)